Vallejo is a station along Line 6 of the Mexico City Metro. It is located in the Colonia Vallejo neighborhood of the Azcapotzalco borough of northwestern Mexico City.

Its logo represents a silhouette of a factory. The station opened on 21 December 1983.

Ridership

References

External links
 

Vallejo
Railway stations opened in 1983
1983 establishments in Mexico
Mexico City Metro stations in Azcapotzalco